Martin Breddy (born 23 September 1961) is an English cricketer. He played ten first-class matches for Cambridge University Cricket Club in 1984.

See also
 List of Cambridge University Cricket Club players

References

External links
 

1961 births
Living people
English cricketers
Cambridge University cricketers
Sportspeople from Torquay